John Hogg (14 February 1818 – 30 October 1885) was an English cricketer. Hogg's batting style is unknown, though it is known he played as a wicket-keeper. He was born at Woodborough, Nottinghamshire.

Hogg made his first-class debut for Nottinghamshire against a combined Yorkshire and Durham team in 1858 at Portrack Lane, Stockton-on-Tees. He made two further first-class appearances for Nottinghamshire, both against Surrey at The Oval in 1859 and 1861. He later made two first-class appearances for the North in two North v South fixtures in 1861 at Lord's and The Oval. In his five first-class matches, Hogg scored 78 runs at an average of 13.00, with a high score of 31. Behind the stumps he took two catches and made four stumpings.

He died at Burton Joyce, Nottinghamshire on 30 October 1885.

References

External links
John Hogg at ESPNcricinfo
John Hogg at CricketArchive

1818 births
1885 deaths
People from Woodborough, Nottinghamshire
Cricketers from Nottinghamshire
English cricketers
Nottinghamshire cricketers
North v South cricketers
Wicket-keepers